Agelanthus myrsinifolius is a species of hemiparasitic plant in the family Loranthaceae, which is native to Rwanda, Zaire and Burundi.

Description 
For a brief description see the African Plant database.

Habitat and ecology
A. myrsinifolius has been found at altitudes of 1900–3300 m in montane or swamp forests and in heaths.  Recorded hosts are Myrsine and  Erica mannii (at the higher altitudes).

Threats 
At lower altitudes, intense human population pressure means that  outside the protected areas, forest is disappearing due to agriculture and logging. At these altitudes, the host, Myrsine, is being cleared for agriculture. At the higher altitudes, the heath, Erica mannii, is probably safe.

References

External links
 JSTOR Global Plants: Agelanthus myrsinifolius. Accessed 23 March 2018.
 Flore d'Afrique Centrale: Agelanthus myrsinifolius. Accessed 23 March 2018.
 The International Plant Names Index: Agelanthus myrsinifolius. Accessed 23 March 2018.

Flora of Rwanda
Flora of the Democratic Republic of the Congo
Flora of Burundi
myrsinifolius